Submergence may refer to:

Submergence (film), a 2017 film by Wim Wenders
Submergence (novel), a 2012 book by J. M. Ledgard
Submersion (disambiguation)

See also
Submerge (disambiguation)
Deep-submergence vehicle
Deep-submergence rescue vehicle
Submersible